Great Neck Public Schools is a public school district serving students residing in specific areas of Great Neck, North New Hyde Park, North Hills, and Manhasset Hills, New York. It is Union Free School District Number 7 in the Town of North Hempstead in Nassau County, on Long Island, in New York, United States.

About 6,846 students according to Niche rankings, grades K-12, attend the Great Neck Public Schools. On May 21, 2019, the voters of this district passed a budget of $234,418,944.

As of the 2015-16 school year, the district's ten schools had a total enrollment of 6,399 students and 585.0 classroom teachers (on an FTE basis), for a student-teacher ratio of 10.7.

List of schools

Current schools 
There are three high schools: North High School, with an alternative program, Community School; South High School; and The Village School, a small alternative high school. There are also two middle schools, four elementary schools, and a nursery school.

 High schools:
 Great Neck North High School
 Great Neck South High School
 Great Neck Village High School (Alternative school)
 Middle schools:
 Great Neck North Middle School
 Great Neck South Middle School
 Elementary schools:
 E. M. Baker Elementary School
 John F. Kennedy Elementary School
 Lakeville Elementary School
 Saddle Rock Elementary School
 Nursery school:
 Parkville School

Former schools 
Declining student population through the 1970s and 1980s resulted in a reduction in the number of operating elementary schools from eleven in 1954 to only four today. The previously operational schools included:

Early schools

Modern day schools

Academic performance 
Based on the 2020 Niche rankings, the Great Neck Union Free School District is the number one public school district in New York and number three in the US, beating out its rivals — Jericho and Manhasset Union Free School District. In 2017, 75% of all students in this district were proficient in the English Language Arts while 78% of all students in this district are considered proficient in Mathematics.

See also 

 List of school districts in New York

References

External links 

 Great Neck School District
 Data for the Great Neck School District, National Center for Education Statistics
 
 Match, Richard. Lucky Seven: A History of the Great Neck Public Schools, Union Free School District No. 7, Great Neck Public Schools 150th Anniversary Committee, 1964. The Great Neck Library has provided this download to view scanned images of the book. It is a 7.2 MiB PDF file.

Great Neck Peninsula
School districts in New York (state)
Education in Nassau County, New York
1814 establishments in New York (state)